Chen Xiaoxia (Chinese: 陈肖霞; October 8, 1962) is a former Chinese diver.

Chen was born in Dongguan, Guangdong Province. She started diving training in 1973, and was recruited into Guangdong provincial team in the next year. In 1976, she won a 2nd place in national competition, and was admitted into Chinese national team in the following year. In 1978, Chen competed at Asian Games and won a gold medal in women's platform.

She claimed platform champion at 1979 Universiade, thus became China's first world champion in diving. From late 1970s to early 1980s, Chen claimed most world champions in women's platform diving. However, due to China's boycott to 1980 Moscow Olympic Games, Chen didn't win Olympic champion in the climax of her career. Four years later, Chen competed at 1984 Olympic Games, and claimed the 4th place. She retired after that.

References

1962 births
Living people
Chinese female divers
Divers at the 1984 Summer Olympics
Olympic divers of China
People from Dongguan
Asian Games medalists in diving
Sportspeople from Guangdong
Divers at the 1978 Asian Games
Asian Games gold medalists for China
Medalists at the 1978 Asian Games
Universiade medalists in diving
Universiade gold medalists for China
Medalists at the 1979 Summer Universiade
Medalists at the 1981 Summer Universiade
20th-century Chinese women